Barbara Kopple (born July 30, 1946) is an American film director known primarily for her documentary work. She is credited with pioneering a renaissance of cinema vérité, and bringing the historic french style to a modern American audience.

She has won two Academy Awards, the first in 1977 for Harlan County, USA, about a Kentucky miners' strike,[1] and the second in 1991 for American Dream, the story of the 1985–86 Hormel strike in Austin, Minnesota.[2] Consequently, she is the first woman to have won twice in the Oscar's Best Documentary category.

Kopple also directed Bearing Witness, a 2005 documentary about five women journalists stationed in combat zones during the Iraq War. She is known for her work with artists, including A Conversation With Gregory Peck as well as documentaries on Mike Tyson, Woody Allen, and Mariel Hemingway. She was on tour with the Dixie Chicks when lead singer Natalie Maines criticized the Iraq War. The film, Shut Up and Sing, debuted at the Toronto International Film Festival. It went on to win a Special Jury Prize at the Chicago International Film Festival, and two Audience awards (Sydney Film Festival and Aspen Film Fest).

She has directed episodes of the television drama series Homicide: Life on the Street and Oz, winning a Directors Guild of America award for the former.

Early life

Kopple grew up on a vegetable farm in Scarsdale, New York, the daughter of a textile executive. Her mother and maternal grandparents grew up in Peekskill, New York, the latter of who publicly criticized the attempted censorship of singer Paul Robeson in 1949. She studied psychology at Northeastern University, where she opted to make her first film instead of writing a term paper for a clinical psychology course. This experience began Kopple's interest in filmmaking. Kopple's political involvement started in college with her participation in antiwar protests against the Vietnam War.

Career 
Kopple attended the School of Visual Arts soon thereafter, where Kopple met documentary filmmakers Albert and David Maysles through a classmate. She assisted them on their documentary Salesman, and then did camera work for their film on the Rolling Stones, titled Gimme Shelter. Reflecting on her time working with the Maysles, Kopple said “the wonderful thing about working for Alan and David Maysles was that they were the first company that treated women as equals...everybody attended all the meetings; everybody's opinion was important.” She subsequently worked as an editor, camera operator, and sound operator on numerous documentaries and then started production on Harlan County, USA in 1972. She also created a production company in 1972, Cabin Creek Films, through which she would continue to direct and produce features and television projects, in addition to documentaries. Notable intern alums from her production company, Cabin Creek Films, include Jesse Moss, Kristi Jacobson, and Jan Ackerman.

Harlan County, USA 
Kopple first became aware of the plights of the Appalachia miners while studying at Northeastern University. In 1972, Kopple started her own production company, Cabin Creek Films. It was during this time that miners walked off the job in Harlan County, and Kopple began the filming Miners for Democracy movement led by Arnold Miller. When Tony Boyle was ousted from the union leadership and miners began striking for union recognition, Kopple moved to Harlan with a crew of five and a loan of $12,000. Kopple and her crew lived with the miners, filming even when they ran out of film because the presence of a camera “kept down violence.”

Harlan County, USA took four years to make and cost over $200,000. Continuing production was financially demanding on Kopple and her small crew, who regularly moved back-and-forth between Harlan and New York to collect financial backing from grant proposals and odd jobs, even writing letters for money from miners’ homes. When she ran out of money, Kopple would “come back to New York and take whatever job I could, editing, sound, until I got enough to go back.” Kopple also accepted donated money from her parents, friends and others in order to continue financing the project; she eventually placed herself into great debt for the film, utilizing her personal credit card for many expenses.

Kopple was threatened by mine owners during filming, being told that “if I was ever caught alone at night I'd be killed.” She reportedly carried two pistols while filming in Harlan.

Harlan County, USA debuted at the New York Film Festival in October, 1976, where it received a standing ovation. The film won the Academy Award for Best Documentary Feature, Kopple accepting the award “on behalf of the miners of Harlan County who took us into their homes, trusted us, and shared their love with us.”

After Harlan County, USA, Kopple didn't finish another documentary until 1990. Kopple instead took her political focus on unions to television, directing the 90-minute television drama Keeping On.

American Dream 
American Dream, Kopple's next feature-length documentary captured the 1985–86 Hormel strike, a two-year-long workers strike against Hormel Foods. Kopple was first turned onto the subject matter in the early 1980s while working on starting a different documentary project. While driving in Worthington, Minn., Kopple heard a new radio broadcast on developing strikes amongst workers in meatpacking plants of Austin. Kopple reportedly started driving towards Austin immediately; “that was the beginning,” said Kopple, “And I never left."

American Dream proved to be even more difficult for Kopple to produce than Harlan County, USA, despite her previous documentary's success. Budget for the film was tight, and Kopple found it difficult to obtain funding due to its subject matter. It took five years for Kopple to obtain financing for the film, and mentions her personal belief that her previous Oscar win hindered funding support.

Unlike Harlan County, which had Kopple very much on one side of the battle, Kopple intentionally aimed to be much more objective in depicting the differing perspectives of the Hormel Strike in American Dream. “I cared about the people in Austin, Minn., very much,” Kopple reflected, “but if we were ever to look back at [the film], we had to have the full story.”

American Dream premiered at the New York Film Festival on October 6, 1990. It eventually earned Kopple her second Academy Award the following year. Kopple continued to exclusively make documentaries for nearly the next decade and a half, exploring new subject matters such as crime procedurals and the lives of celebrities.

Shut Up and Sing 

Directed and produced in tandem, Barbara Kopple and Cecilia Peck debuted Shut Up and Sing in 2006. The film follows musicians the Dixie Chicks as they face backlash for comments against the Bush administration and the invasion of Iraq.Kopple's style is evident in use of candid clips of the performers discussing the fallout combined with a focus on what their daily lives look like. While the musicians maintain grace whilst getting death threats for their remarks publicly, Kopple and Peck show the burden it places upon them at home. It is truly mimetic of a "fly on the wall," a trademark of Kopple's filmmaking.

Critical reception of the film was mixed at the time. The left-leaning outlets praised the documentary and the Dixie Chicks for their bravery. Right-wing media continued to criticize the group and to criticize Kopple and Peck for their decision to cover such "traitors."

In years since the premiere, many news outlets (such as The Guardian and The New York Times) have come back to the documentary, writing about why it is such a landmark film for its political nature.

Other Films of Note 
Her first non-documentary feature film to play in theaters, Havoc, starred Anne Hathaway and Bijou Phillips as wealthy suburbanites who venture into East Los Angeles Latino gang territory, and was released straight to DVD in 2005. Kopple has recently ventured into advertising work that includes documentary-style commercials for Target Stores.

She was among the 19 filmmakers who worked together anonymously (under the rubric Winterfilm Collective) to produce the film Winter Soldier, an anti-war documentary about the Winter Soldier Investigation. She has also done films for The Working Group, directing the 30-minute short documentary Locked Out in America: Voices From Ravenswood for the We Do the Work series. (We Do the Work aired in the mid-1990s on the PBS television series "P.O.V.", and Kopple's segment was based on the book Ravenswood: The Steelworkers' Victory and the Revival of American Labor.)

In 2012 Kopple released two films. One is about Mariel Hemingway, the granddaughter of Ernest Hemingway, and the other is concerning the 150th Anniversary of The Nation magazine. The film on Hemingway, Running from Crazy, was shown at the 2013 Sundance Film Festival and on the Oprah Winfrey Network.

In 2014, Sight and Sound published a list of its Greatest Documentaries of All Time, and Kopple's film Harlan County, USA (1976) was ranked 24th, tied with two other movies.[3][4]

When beginning to make the film Harlan County, USA, Kopple was promised a $9,000 grant, then later was denied. This happened countless times before she eventually secured the necessary funds. The moving image collection of Barbara Kopple is held at the Academy Film Archive, which preserved Harlan County, USA.

Style and themes 
Kopple is a documentary filmmaker and has validated her art form in response to criticism that documentaries seem past their prime: "people want to get a sense of truthfulness in terms of what's happening and what's going on. Documentaries do that."

She has noted her major influence to be director Lucy Jarvis, for her both her approach to life and prolificness. Kopple's documentaries are in the style of cinema vérité. Reflecting on her documentaries in 1991, Kopple said “the kind of films that influenced me have more to do with watching people, letting scenes come alive so you actually see people change through the course of the film...almost like you're right there.” Her work typically consist of observational footage, minimal voice-overs and intimate interviews with her subjects. She is quoted saying "I really love people, and I love telling their stories and I feel so excited when I get to do so" and "I try so hard to let the characters be the ones that carry the story and say the things they want to say." Thus she is humanist in her approach to storytelling. She has listed the Maysle brothers and D. A. Pennebaker as notable influences on her technique. “I absolutely loved Don't Look Back because he got so close to Dylan,” Kopple said of Pennebacker. “I wanted to make films that were as intimate as that.”

Kopple's work is often politically driven. She has made several films on U.S. labor issues, as well as worker's unions, and has been a longtime advocate for the American labor movement. Many of her documentaries revolve around political subject matters, but her more recent work has taken a shift towards music documentary and celebrity portraiture.

For her documentaries, Kopple works in small crews of two to five, almost always acting as her own sound operator.

Kopple embraces a collaborative approach to filmmaking, particularly in the editing process.The collaborative models of working originates from her internship with the Maysles Brothers in Gimme Shelter (1970) and later joining the film collective that would produce Winter Soldier (1972). While editing Harlan County, USA, Kopple sought multiple editors for the nine-month post-production process. She used the same process when editing Shut Up & Sing, stating, "We were working with so many different editors and different sensibilities but the discussions we had were sensational, because you couldn't say no. You had to explain how it moved the story forward or what it gave the characters so it was very egalitarian in the editing room."

Ethics 
Past financial struggles influenced Kopple's embrace of commercial projects, her recent partnership was with YouTube's production of This is Everything: Gigi Gorgeous. She has partnered with studios such as ABC, NBC, Lifetime Television, Disney Channel and The Weinstein Company. Kopple responds to criticism surrounding lack of authenticity in commissioned films citing the conventions of cinéma vérité and direct cinema that she followed in her first films. She relies on a neutral outlook when approaching the subject matter of her films, some of whom were controversial figures such as Woody Allen and Mike Tyson.

She upholds the strength of women filmmakers citing Rory Kennedy, Mirra Bank, Liz Garbus, and Kristi Jacobson as both colleagues and inspirations. She notes also that there is a benefit to being a woman filmmaker in that "it's easier because people are not intimidated by you." She utilizes the underestimation of women as a positive bridge to understanding her subjects. When asked about the domination of men in the film industry she explains that, for better or for worse, this does not impact her; there are few men in her field as there is little money in documentary filmmaking.

Kopple actively participates in organizations that address social issues and support independent filmmaking.

Personal life 
Kopple describes herself as a "filmmaker and mom." She is a niece of the American playwright Murray Burnett.

Filmography 

 1972: Winter Soldier
 1976: Harlan County, USA
 1981: Keeping On
 1990: American Dream
 1992: Beyond JFK: The Question of Conspiracy
 1993: Fallen Champ: The Untold Story of Mike Tyson
 1994: Century of Women: Sexuality and Social Justice
 1994: Century of Women: Work and Family
 1997: Homicide: Life on the Street - The Documentary
 1997: Wild Man Blues
 1998: Homicide: Life on the Street - Pit Bull Sessions
 1999: A Conversation with Gregory Peck
 1999: Homicide: Life on the Street - Self Defense
 2000: My Generation
 2002: American Standoff
 2002: The Hamptons
 2004: Bearing Witness
 2004: Dance Cuba: Dreams of Flight
 2004: WMD: Weapons of Mass Deception
 2005: Havoc
 2006: Shut Up & Sing
 2010: 30 for 30: The House of Steinbrenner
 2011: Gunfight
 2013: Running from Crazy
 2015: Miss Sharon Jones!
 2016: Gigi Gorgeous: This is Everything
 2017: A Murder in Mansfield
2018: New Homeland
2019: Desert One

Awards and nominations 
 1977: Academy Award for Best Documentary Feature, Harlan County, USA
 1990: CINE Golden Eagle for Documentary, American Dream
 1991: Academy Award for Best Documentary Feature, American Dream
 1992: DGA Award for Outstanding Directorial Achievement in Documentary/Actuality, American Dream
 1993: Nominee for Primetime Emmy in Outstanding Individual Achievement – Informational Programming, Fallen Champ: The Untold Story of Mike Tyson
 1993: Woman in Film Crystal Awards, Dorothy Arzner Directors Award
 1994: American Film Institute, USA, Maya Deren Independent Film and Video Artists Award
 1994: CINE Golden Eagle for Documentary, A Century of Women
 1994: DGA Award for Outstanding Directorial Achievement in Documentary/Actuality, Fallen Champ: The Untold Story of Mike Tyson
 1995: Nominee for Primetime Emmy in Outstanding Informational Series, A Century of Woman
 1998: DGA Award for Outstanding Directorial Achievement in Dramatic Series’, Homicide: Life on the Street
 1998: Human Rights Watch International Film Festival, Lifetime Achievement Award
 2005: CINE Golden Eagle for Documentary, Bearing Witness
 2006: Nominee for EDA Award for Best Documentary by or About Women, Shut Up & Sing
 2006: Audience Award for Audience Favorite Documentary, Shut Up & Sing
 2006: Woman Film Critics Circle Awards, Lifetime Achievement Award
 2006: Special Jury Prize for DocuFest Competition, Shut Up & Sing
 2010: Nominated for Emmy in Outstanding Arts & Culture Documentary, Woodstock: Now & Then
 2011: Felix Award for Best Documentary, American Dream
 2011: Grand Festival Award for Documentary, Bagels, Borscht, and Brotherhood – Allen Ginsberg 
 2014: Nominee for Primetime Emmy in Outstanding Documentary or Nonfiction, Running from Crazy
 2017: Nominated for Emmy in Outstanding Arts & Culture Documentary, Miss Sharon Jones!
 2018: Athena Film Festival, Laura Ziskin Lifetime Achievement Award
 2018: Hot Docs Outstanding Achievement Award

See also

 List of female film and television directors 
American film directors
 Women's cinema
Academy Award Winners
Cinéma vérité

References

External links
Barbara Kopple's website

The Working Group
Cabin Creek Films
Barbara Kopple's Harlan County USA on MoMA Learning

1946 births
20th-century American Jews
American television directors
American documentary film directors
American women television directors
Living people
Northeastern University alumni
People from Scarsdale, New York
Coal miner activists
Directors of Best Documentary Feature Academy Award winners
Directors Guild of America Award winners
Scarsdale High School alumni
Film directors from New York (state)
American women documentary filmmakers
21st-century American Jews
20th-century American women
21st-century American women